Burge Lake Provincial Park was established in 1961 and is  in size. It is located on the west shore of the lake, about 10 km. north of Lynn Lake off PTR 394  The park has a small cottage subdivision, a campground, a boat launch and a beach with children's playground.

Burge Lake belongs to the Churchill River watershed, draining into Goldsand Lake. It is the site of the annual catch and release fishing derby for northern pike held on Canada Day.

See also
List of protected areas of Manitoba
List of provincial parks in Manitoba

References

External links

Provincial parks of Manitoba
Protected areas of Manitoba